Johan Martin Preisler (14 March 1715 in Nuremberg – 17 November 1794 in Copenhagen) was a German engraver, most notable for his work in Denmark where he was professor at the Royal Danish Academy of Fine Arts. He was the grandson of the painter Daniel Preissler (1627-1665) and the son of the painter Johannes Daniel Preisler (1666 – 1737) and Anna Felicitas (née Riedner), making him the brother of the painters Johann Justin Preisler (1698-1771), Georg Martin Preisler(1700-1754), Barbara Helena Preisler, married Oeding (1707-1758), and Valentin Daniel Preisler (1717-1765) ). His children included the engraver Johann Georg Preisler (1757-1831) and the actor and writer Joachim Daniel Preisler (1755-1809), married to the actress Marie Cathrine Preisler (1761-1797). The family came from an old glass making dynasty in Bohemia.

External links
Johan Martin Preisler in the Dansk biografisk Lexikon

1715 births
1794 deaths
18th-century Danish engravers
German engravers
Artists from Nuremberg